The following is a partial list of the "A" codes for Medical Subject Headings (MeSH), as defined by the United States National Library of Medicine (NLM).

This list continues the information at List of MeSH codes (A07). Codes following these are found at List of MeSH codes (A09). For other MeSH codes, see List of MeSH codes.

The source for this content is the set of 2006 MeSH Trees from the NLM.

– nervous system

– central nervous system

– brain
  – blood–brain barrier
  – brain stem
  – mesencephalon
  – corpora quadrigemina
  – inferior colliculus
  – superior colliculus
  – locus coeruleus
  – raphe nuclei
  – substantia nigra
  – tegmentum mesencephali
  – cerebral aqueduct
  – pedunculopontine tegmental nucleus
  – periaqueductal gray
  – red nucleus
  – ventral tegmental area
  – reticular formation
  – respiratory center
  – rhombencephalon
  – medulla oblongata
  – area postrema
  – olivary nucleus
  – solitary nucleus
  – metencephalon
  – cerebellum
  – cerebellar cortex
  – purkinje cells
  – cerebellar nuclei
  – cerebellopontine angle
  – pons
  – cochlear nucleus
  – locus coeruleus
  – vestibular nuclei
  – vestibular nucleus, lateral
  – raphe nuclei
  – trigeminal nuclei
  – trigeminal nucleus, spinal
  – trigeminal caudal nucleus
  – cerebellum
  – cerebral ventricles
  – cerebral aqueduct
  – choroid plexus
  – ependyma
  – fourth ventricle
  – lateral ventricles
  – septum pellucidum
  – third ventricle
  – limbic system
  – amygdala
  – epithalamus
  – habenula
  – fornix (brain)
  – gyrus cinguli
  – hippocampus
  – dentate gyrus
  – mossy fibers, hippocampal
  – pyramidal cells
  – hypothalamus
  – olfactory pathways
  – islands of calleja
  – olfactory bulb
  – parahippocampal gyrus
  – entorhinal cortex
  – septum of brain
  – septal nuclei
  – substantia innominata
  – prosencephalon
  – diencephalon
  – epithalamus
  – habenula
  – pineal gland
  – hypothalamus
  – hypothalamic area, lateral
  – hypothalamus, anterior
  – anterior hypothalamic nucleus
  – paraventricular hypothalamic nucleus
  – preoptic area
  – suprachiasmatic nucleus
  – supraoptic nucleus
  – hypothalamus, middle
  – arcuate nucleus
  – dorsomedial hypothalamic nucleus
  – hypothalamo-hypophyseal system
  – median eminence
  – pituitary gland
  – pituitary gland, anterior
  – pituitary gland, posterior
  – tuber cinereum
  – ventromedial hypothalamic nucleus
  – hypothalamus, posterior
  – mamillary bodies
  – subthalamus
  – entopeduncular nucleus
  – subthalamic nucleus
  – thalamus
  – thalamic nuclei
  – anterior thalamic nuclei
  – geniculate bodies
  – intralaminar thalamic nuclei
  – lateral thalamic nuclei
  – pulvinar
  – mediodorsal thalamic nucleus
  – midline thalamic nuclei
  – posterior thalamic nuclei
  – ventral thalamic nuclei
  – telencephalon
  – basal ganglia
  – amygdala
  – corpus striatum
  – globus pallidus
  – neostriatum
  – caudate nucleus
  – putamen
  – nucleus accumbens
  – substantia innominata
  – basal nucleus of meynert
  – cerebral cortex
  – frontal lobe
  – motor cortex
  – prefrontal cortex
  – neocortex
  – occipital lobe
  – visual cortex
  – parietal lobe
  – somatosensory cortex
  – pyramidal cells
  – temporal lobe
  – auditory cortex
  – parahippocampal gyrus
  – entorhinal cortex
  – corpus callosum
  – diagonal band of broca
  – fornix (brain)
  – internal capsule
  – islands of calleja
  – olfactory pathways
  – islands of calleja
  – olfactory bulb
  – septum of brain
  – septal nuclei
  – septum pellucidum

– meninges
  – arachnoid
  – subarachnoid space
  – cisterna magna
  – dura mater
  – subdural space
  – pia mater

– neural analyzers

– spinal cord
  – anterior horn cells
  – extrapyramidal tracts
  – posterior horn cells
  – substantia gelatinosa
  – pyramidal tracts
  – spinothalamic tracts

– ganglia

– ganglia, autonomic
  – ganglia, parasympathetic
  – ganglia, sympathetic
  – stellate ganglion
  – superior cervical ganglion

– ganglia, invertebrate

– ganglia, sensory
  – ganglia, spinal
  – geniculate ganglion
  – nodose ganglion
  – spiral ganglion
  – trigeminal ganglion

– satellite cells, perineuronal

– nerve net

– nerve tissue

– ependyma

– neurilemma

– neural pathways

– afferent pathways
  – auditory pathways
  – olfactory pathways
  – spinocerebellar tracts
  – spinothalamic tracts
  – visceral afferents
  – visual pathways

– efferent pathways
  – extrapyramidal tracts
  – pyramidal tracts

– internal capsule

– medial forebrain bundle

– perforant pathway

– neuroglia

– astrocytes

– microglia

– neuropil
  – neuropil threads

– oligodendroglia
  – myelin sheath

– satellite cells, perineuronal

– schwann cells
  – myelin sheath
  – neurilemma
  – ranvier's nodes

– neurons

– dendrites
  – dendritic spines
  – neurites

– growth cones

– interneurons
  – amacrine cells
  – retinal bipolar cells

– lewy bodies

– nerve fibers
  – adrenergic fibers
  – sympathetic fibers, postganglionic
  – autonomic fibers, postganglionic
  – parasympathetic fibers, postganglionic
  – sympathetic fibers, postganglionic
  – autonomic fibers, preganglionic
  – axons
  – neurites
  – presynaptic terminals
  – mossy fibers, hippocampal
  – cholinergic fibers
  – autonomic fibers, preganglionic
  – parasympathetic fibers, postganglionic
  – nerve fibers, myelinated
  – myelin sheath
  – neurilemma
  – ranvier's nodes
  – nerve fibers, unmyelinated

– neurofibrils
  – neurofibrillary tangles

– neurons, afferent
  – hair cells
  – hair cells, inner
  – hair cells, outer
  – hair cells, vestibular
  – olfactory receptor neurons
  – photoreceptors
  – photoreceptors, invertebrate
  – photoreceptors, vertebrate
  – cones
  – rods
  – rod outer segments
  – retinal ganglion cells
  – posterior horn cells
  – substantia gelatinosa
  – retinal ganglion cells

– neurons, efferent
  – motor neurons
  – anterior horn cells
  – motor neurons, gamma

– neuropil
  – neuropil threads

– nissl bodies

– nitrergic neurons

– purkinje cells

– pyramidal cells

– senile plaques

– neurosecretory systems

– corpora allata

– hypothalamo-hypophyseal system
  – median eminence
  – pituitary gland
  – pituitary gland, anterior
  – pituitary gland, posterior

– pineal gland

– subcommissural organ

– subfornical organ

– peripheral nervous system

– autonomic nervous system
  – autonomic pathways
  – autonomic fibers, postganglionic
  – parasympathetic fibers, postganglionic
  – sympathetic fibers, postganglionic
  – autonomic fibers, preganglionic
  – celiac plexus
  – hypogastric plexus
  – myenteric plexus
  – splanchnic nerves
  – submucous plexus
  – vagus nerve
  – laryngeal nerves
  – recurrent laryngeal nerve
  – nodose ganglion
  – enteric nervous system
  – myenteric plexus
  – submucous plexus
  – ganglia, autonomic
  – ganglia, parasympathetic
  – ganglia, sympathetic
  – stellate ganglion
  – superior cervical ganglion
  – parasympathetic nervous system
  – ganglia, parasympathetic
  – parasympathetic fibers, postganglionic
  – vagus nerve
  – laryngeal nerves
  – recurrent laryngeal nerve
  – nodose ganglion
  – sympathetic nervous system
  – ganglia, sympathetic
  – stellate ganglion
  – superior cervical ganglion
  – splanchnic nerves
  – vasomotor system
  – pressoreceptors

– ganglia, sensory
  – ganglia, spinal
  – geniculate ganglion
  – nodose ganglion
  – spiral ganglion
  – trigeminal ganglion

– nerve endings
  – neuroeffector junction
  – neuromuscular junction
  – motor endplate
  – receptors, sensory
  – chemoreceptors
  – neuroepithelial cells
  – neuroepithelial bodies
  – olfactory receptor neurons
  – paraganglia, nonchromaffin
  – aortic bodies
  – carotid body
  – glomus jugulare
  – glomus tympanicum
  – taste buds
  – mechanoreceptors
  – golgi-mazzoni corpuscles
  – merkel cells
  – muscle spindles
  – neuroepithelial cells
  – hair cells
  – hair cells, inner
  – hair cells, outer
  – hair cells, vestibular
  – pacinian corpuscles
  – pressoreceptors
  – pulmonary stretch receptors
  – nociceptors
  – photoreceptors
  – photoreceptors, invertebrate
  – photoreceptors, vertebrate
  – cones
  – rods
  – rod outer segments
  – thermoreceptors

– peripheral nerves
  – autonomic pathways
  – autonomic fibers, postganglionic
  – parasympathetic fibers, postganglionic
  – sympathetic fibers, postganglionic
  – autonomic fibers, preganglionic
  – celiac plexus
  – hypogastric plexus
  – myenteric plexus
  – splanchnic nerves
  – submucous plexus
  – vagus nerve
  – laryngeal nerves
  – recurrent laryngeal nerve
  – nodose ganglion
  – blood-nerve barrier
  – cranial nerves
  – abducens nerve
  – accessory nerve
  – facial nerve
  – chorda tympani nerve
  – geniculate ganglion
  – glossopharyngeal nerve
  – hypoglossal nerve
  – oculomotor nerve
  – olfactory nerve
  – optic nerve
  – optic chiasm
  – optic disk
  – trigeminal nerve
  – mandibular nerve
  – lingual nerve
  – maxillary nerve
  – ophthalmic nerve
  – trigeminal ganglion
  – trochlear nerve
  – vagus nerve
  – laryngeal nerves
  – recurrent laryngeal nerve
  – nodose ganglion
  – vestibulocochlear nerve
  – cochlear nerve
  – spiral ganglion
  – vestibular nerve
  – schwann cells
  – myelin sheath
  – neurilemma
  – ranvier's nodes
  – spinal nerves
  – brachial plexus
  – median nerve
  – musculocutaneous nerve
  – radial nerve
  – ulnar nerve
  – cervical plexus
  – phrenic nerve
  – lumbosacral plexus
  – femoral nerve
  – obturator nerve
  – sciatic nerve
  – peroneal nerve
  – tibial nerve
  – sural nerve
  – spinal nerve roots
  – cauda equina
  – ganglia, spinal
  – thoracic nerves
  – intercostal nerves

– synapses

– neuroeffector junction
  – neuromuscular junction
  – motor endplate

– presynaptic terminals
  – mossy fibers, hippocampal

– synaptic membranes

– synaptic vesicles

The list continues at List of MeSH codes (A09).

A08